Isaac Blackwell (died 1699) was a composer and English  Cathedral organist, who served at St. Paul's Cathedral.

Background
His compositions are not well known.

Amongst his madrigal output are:
“Give me thy youth”
I saw fair Cloris walk alone.

An anthem "O Lord our Governor" was included in the Chapel Royal Partbooks., and "Bow down thine ear, O Lord" in the Gostling Partbooks.

Career
Organist of:
St Dunstan-in-the-West 1674 - 1699
St Michael, Cornhill 1684 - 1699
St. Paul's Cathedral 1687 - 1699

References

English classical organists
British male organists
Cathedral organists
1699 deaths
17th-century English composers
English male composers
English classical composers
Year of birth unknown
17th-century male musicians
Male classical organists